Paolo Zamboni (18 May 1939 - 1969) was an Italian male hurdler who competed at the 1960 Summer Olympics.

References

External links
 

1939 births
1969 deaths
Athletes (track and field) at the 1960 Summer Olympics
Italian male hurdlers
Olympic athletes of Italy